The 1975 Copa Libertadores Finals was the final two-legged tie to determine the 1975 Copa Libertadores champion. It was contested by Argentine club Independiente and Chilean club Unión Española. The first leg of the tie was played on 18 June at Santiago de Chile' home field, with the second leg played on 25 June at Avellaneda'.

Independiente won the series after winning a tie-breaking playoff 2–0 at Asunción's Estadio Defensores del Chaco, also achieving its four consecutive Copa Libertadores title.

Qualified teams

Venues

Match details

First leg

Second leg

Playoff

References

1
Copa Libertadores Finals
Copa Libertadores Final 1975
Copa Libertadores Final 1975
Copa
Copa
Football in Avellaneda